Hip Hop World Magazine is a weekly Nigerian music magazine established in 1995. It has sponsored The Headies award since the award's inception in 2006.  The magazine's publisher is Nigerian journalist and music promoter Ayo Animashaun.

References

1995 establishments in Nigeria
Hip hop magazines
Magazines established in 1995
Magazines published in Nigeria
Weekly magazines